Parliamentary elections were held in Uzbekistan on 5 December 1999, with a second round in 66 of the 250 constituencies on 19 December. The People's Democratic Party of Uzbekistan emerged as the largest party, with 49 of the 250 seats. Voter turnout was 95.0%.

Results

References

Uzbekistan
1999 in Uzbekistan
Elections in Uzbekistan
Election and referendum articles with incomplete results